Public universities:
 National University of Mongolia
 Mongolian University of Science and Technology
 Mongolian State University of Education
 Mongolian National University of Medical Sciences
 Mongolian University of Life Sciences
 University of Internal Affairs of Mongolia
 National Defense University
 Mongolian National University of Arts and Culture
 Khovd University
 Dornod University
 Mongolian Railway Institute
 National University of Commerce and Business
 Ulaanbaatar State University
 Institute of Labor and Social Relations
 Mongolian State Conservatory
 German-Mongolian Institute for Resources and Technology
 Buddhist University of Mongolia
 National Academy of Governance
 National Intelligence Academy
Private universities:
 Mongolian National University
 University of Finance and Economics
 Etugen University
 University of the Humanities
 Ikh Zasag International University
 Ulaanbaatar Erdem University
 Mandakh University
 Institute of Education, Culture and Law
 Global Leadership University
 International University of Ulaanbaatar
 Citi University
 Ach Medical University
 Orkhon University
 Otgontenger University
 Gazarchin Institute
 Mongolian University of Pharmaceutical Sciences
 National Technical University
 New Medical University
 Ider University
 Mon Altius Institute
 Shihihutug Law University
 The University of Construction and Design of Mongolia
 Zasagt Khan Institute
 Royal International University
 Mongolian National Institute of Physical Education
 Graduate University of Mongolia
 Margad Institute
 Darkhan Institute
 Huree University
 Institute of International Economics and Business
 National University of Economics
 Institute Of Engineering and Technology
 Soyol-Erdem Institute
 Tsetsee Goun Institute
 Mongolia International University
 Khangai Institute
 San University
 Urlakh Erdem Fashion design Institute
 Institute of Movie art
 Avarga Institute
 Eco-Asia Institute
 Tenger Institute
 Otoch Manramba University
 Gurvan Erdene Institute of Pedagogy
 Tushee Institute
 Institute of Technology
 Tsakhim Institute
 Institute of International Studies
 New Mongol Institute of Technology
 Seruuleg University
 Human Resources Management College
 New Civilization Institute
 Enerel Institute
 International University of China and Mongolia
 Institute of Sociology and Psychology
 Institute of Literature and Social Work
 Institute of Language and Civilization
 Chinggis Khaan Institute
 New Mongol Collage of Technology
 Gurvan Tamir College
 Zuun Khuree College
 Construction Technology College
Branches of foreign higher educational institutions:
 Ulan Bator Institute (branch) of Plekhanov Russian University of Economics
 Raffles International Institute of Ulaanbaatar

References

External links

Mongolian National Council for education Accreditation

Universities

Mongolia
Mongolia